Atrytonopsis vierecki, or Viereck's skipper, is a species of grass skipper in the butterfly family Hesperiidae. It is found in North America.

The MONA or Hodges number for Atrytonopsis vierecki is 4083.

References

Further reading

 

Hesperiinae
Articles created by Qbugbot
Butterflies described in 1902